Kirat Yakthung Chumlung (Nepali: किरात याक्थुङ चुम्लुङ) (1989) is a social organization of the Limbu indigenous ethnic group of Nepal.

See also
 Kirat

References

External links
 Official web site of Kirat Yakthung Chumlung Central Committee Nepal
 Official web site of Kirat Yakthung Chumlung in UK

Indigenous organisations in Nepal
1989 establishments in Nepal